Kreuznach is an electoral constituency (German: Wahlkreis) represented in the Bundestag. It elects one member via first-past-the-post voting. Under the current constituency numbering system, it is designated as constituency 201. It is located in central Rhineland-Palatinate, comprising the districts of Bad Kreuznach and Birkenfeld.

Kreuznach was created for the inaugural 1949 federal election. Since 2013, it has been represented by Joe Weingarten of the Social Democratic Party (SPD).

Geography
Kreuznach is located in central Rhineland-Palatinate. As of the 2021 federal election, it comprises the districts of Bad Kreuznach and Birkenfeld.

History
Kreuznach was created in 1949. In the 1949 election, it was Rhineland-Palatinate constituency 5 in the numbering system. In the 1953 through 1976 elections, it was number 152. In the 1980 through 1998 elections, it was number 150. In the 2002 election, it was number 204. In the 2005 election, it was number 203. In the 2009 and 2013 elections, it was number 202. Since the 2017 election, it has been number 201. Its borders have not changed since its creation.

Members
The constituency was first represented by Hugo Mayer of the Christian Democratic Union (CDU) from 1949 to 1957. Wilhelm Dröscher of the Social Democratic Party (SPD) was elected in 1957 and served until 1972. He was succeeded by fellow SPD member Conrad Ahlers until 1980. Günther Leonhart, also of the SPD, then served from 1980 to 1990. Fritz Rudolf Körper retained the constituency for the SPD in the 1990 election, and was representative until 2005. Julia Klöckner won it for the CDU in 2005 and was re-elected in 2009. Antje Lezius of the CDU was elected in 2013 and re-elected in 2017. Joe Weingarten won the constituency for the SPD in 2021.

Election results

2021 election

2017 election

2013 election

2009 election

Notes

References

Federal electoral districts in Rhineland-Palatinate
1949 establishments in West Germany
Constituencies established in 1949
Bad Kreuznach (district)
Birkenfeld (district)